Médéric Martin Bridge is a viaduct-type bridge in Quebec, Canada that spans Rivière des Prairies between Montreal and Laval. It carries 8 lanes of Quebec Autoroute 15, including 1 reserved bus and carpooling lanes.

It was named after Médéric Martin, who was a Member of Parliament for St. Mary, then Mayor of Montreal. He was a resident of what is now Laval during his tenure as Mayor.

References

See also

List of bridges in Canada
List of bridges in Montreal
List of crossings of the Rivière des Prairies

Bridges in Montreal
Rivière des Prairies
Bridges in Laval, Quebec
Ahuntsic-Cartierville
Road bridges in Quebec
Bridges on the Trans-Canada Highway